FXOpen is a retail and institutional forex broker offering online trading services via MetaTrader 4, MetaTrader 5 and TickTrader trading platforms. It provides access to the electronic communication network (ECN) to trade currency, commodity, indices and stock CFDs. FXOpen companies operate in Australia, Saint Kitts and Nevis, the United Kingdom and Cyprus and have representatives in a number of other countries.

History
FXOpen was founded in 2003 as an educational centre of technical analysis in Egypt. In 2005, the company launched a brokerage services. In 2006, the company introduced Micro accounts and swap-free Shari’a compliant accounts. In 2009, FXOpen developed its own bridge technology that provided retail traders with an access to the ECN market via the MetaTrader platform. Subsequently, it also provided ECN PAMM accounts. 

In August 2014, FXOpen NZ Limited stopped issuing derivatives to retail customers and the company was deregistered from the financial services provider register. In July 2015, New Zealand revoking its registration from the Financial Dispute Resolution Scheme. Since 2015, FXOpen LP Limited (New Zealand) a limited partnership, provides trading technology platform to wholesale customers. 

In 2021, FXOpen launched a trading platform TickTrader which allows to combine trading forex, stocks, indices, and commodities within one trading account.

Operations
FXOpen offers an ECN-integrated MT4, MT5 and TickTrader trading platforms, compatible with algorithmic trading. It enables users to apply various trading robots, known as expert advisors. FXOpen provides traders with proprietary designed One Click Trading Level2 Plugin software (OCTL). The tool was released in 2013 and is regarded as the Level2 application update optimizing the order execution process in the MT4 platform.

Regulatory information
Several regulated companies operate under FXOpen brand name:
FXOpen AU Pty Ltd, based in Perth, is licensed and regulated by the Australian Securities & Investments Commission (AFSL 412871) since July 2012.

FXOpen Ltd, based in London, is regulated by the Financial Conduct Authority (FCA no. 579202) in the United Kingdom since March 2013.

FXOpen LP Limited, registered in Auckland, New Zealand, registration number 5598865.
FXOpen EU Ltd, based in Limassol, Cyprus, is authorized and regulated by the Cyprus Securities and Exchange Commission (CySEC) under license number 194/13.

Sponsorships
The company has used sponsorship to promote itself including, in 2011, FXOpen took participation in organizing  and promoting the FXOpen Drift 2011 competition.

References

External links
 Official website
 FXOpen Prime website

Financial derivative trading companies
Financial services companies established in 2003
Foreign exchange companies
Online brokerages
Financial services companies based in London
Financial services companies of Russia
Companies based in Perth, Western Australia
2003 establishments in Egypt